The Center for Advanced Materials, formerly the Space Vacuum Epitaxy Center, is a laboratory established in 1986 at the University of Houston for researching the science and application of advanced materials. Its facilities contain equipment dedicated to thin-film deposition, processing and characterization of III-V compound semiconductors, high-temperature superconductivity, and ferroelectric oxide material systems. The Wake Shield Facility was developed at this center.

See also
 Epitaxy

External links
 
 archive of the old SVEC website

University of Houston campus
Materials science institutes
Science and technology in Texas
Research institutes in Texas
University and college laboratories in the United States
1986 establishments in Texas
Research institutes established in 1986
Space technology research institutes